Luna a 1998 opera by the pop musician José María Cano, a former member of the pop music group Mecano. It was performed in concert version in 1998 at the Palau de la Música de València in Valencia.

Recording
Luna – excerpts Canciones, Romanzas Y Danzas – María Pagés (dancer, castanets, singer), Ainhoa Arteta (soprano), Renée Fleming (soprano), Teresa Berganza (mezzo-soprano), Plácido Domingo (tenor), Joan Albert Amargós (conductor/piano), Skaila Kanga (harp), Anthony Pleth (cello), Gerardo Núñez (guitar), Don César Sánchez (conductor/piano). Reissue 2018, 41 minutes

References

External links
 , Agnes Baltsa, Plácido Domingo, Ainhoa Arteta, María José Martos

1998 operas
Spanish-language operas
Operas